Brian Roper may refer to:

 Brian Roper (actor) (1929–1994), British and American actor
 Brian Roper (economist) (born 1949), British economist and former vice-chancellor of London Metropolitan University
 Brian Roper (Gaelic footballer), Irish sportsperson